Civil War Roundtables (also referred to as Round Tables or CWRTs) are independent organizations that share a common objective in promoting and expanding interest in the study of the military, political and sociological history of the American Civil War. The oldest such group in the United States is The Civil War Round Table of Chicago, which was founded in 1941 and is based in Chicago, Illinois. The second and perhaps third oldest are the Civil War Round Table of Milwaukee (founded in 1947) and the  Civil War Round Table of Atlanta (founded in 1949). There are hundreds of such organizations throughout the U.S., with some in other countries as well.

There is no national organization to coordinate and publicize the activities of the individual roundtables, although most follow a similar format of holding a monthly meeting (some include a dinner on site or at a nearby restaurant) to make announcements about local Civil War history-related events and to host a presentation by a guest speaker (usually a scholar, professor, author or artist, park ranger, battlefield preservationist, reenactor, or other expert). The meetings might also feature raffles, book signings, door prizes, auctions, fund raisers, and similar activities. Some CWRTs sponsor battlefield preservation events, battle walks, excursions, tours, and other "sanctioned" events.

Many roundtables charge an annual membership fee to help defray expenses, and others cover costs by charging for individual dinner meetings or presentations. Several smaller CWRT groups do not charge any set fees, but instead "pass the hat."  Many are IRS 501(c)(3) entities and accept donations or contributions that are tax-deductible to the extent permitted by law.

Since 2004, Matthew Borowick has been writing a column in the Civil War News about round tables.  The column provides "best practices" information about the formation, management and administration of round tables.  In 2010, he published The Civil War Round Table Handbook, a compilation of those columns.  Mr. Borowick as well as Walter Rueckel and Mike Powell of the Brunswick CWRT, John Bamberl of the Scottsdale CWRT, and Michael Movius of the Puget Sound CWRT, have hosted conferences attended by representatives from various roundtables based throughout the U.S. and Canada to discuss methods to increase collaboration among roundtables and related groups.

External links
 Buffalo CWRT
 Cincinnati CWRT
 CWRT of Acadiana (South-Central Louisiana)
 CWRT of Central Massachusetts
 CWRT of Charleston, SC
 CWRT of Chicago
 CWRT of the District of Columbia
 CWRT of NW Arkansas
 CWRT of the Ozarks, Springfield, MO
 Cleveland CWRT
 Brunswick CWRT
 Delaware Valley CWRT
 Gettysburg CWRT
Hagerstown CWRT
 Idaho CWRT
 Knoxville CWRT
 Puget Sound CWRT
 South Suburban (Chicago) CWRT
 Southern Indiana CWRT
 Twin Cities of Minnesota CWRT
Austin CWRT

Historiography of the American Civil War
Historical societies of the United States